Tabuk, known officially as the City of Tabuk, is a 5th class component city and capital of the province of Kalinga, Philippines. According to the 2020 census, it has a population of 121,033 people.

History
The former municipal district of Tabuk was transformed into a regular municipality by Republic Act No. 533, approved June 16, 1950.

Cityhood

Tabuk became the Cordillera's second city after Baguio on June 23, 2007, when 17,060 voters ratified Republic Act No. 9404.
On November 18, 2008, the Supreme Court voted 6–5 to revert Tabuk, among other 15 cities', status back to municipalities. However, on December 21, 2009, the court reversed its first decision, returning Tabuk and the 15 other municipalities back to cities again. It contended that these cities were not covered by Republic Act 9009 – the law enacted in June 2001 that increased the income requirement for cities from P20 million to P100 million – as proven by transcripts of Senate debates while crafting RA 9009.

But on August 24, 2010, the court made a reversal again, reinstating its November 2008 decision, making Tabuk with other 15 cities to regular municipalities again . It concluded that the Local Government Code as amended by RA 9009 should be followed, without exception.

Finally, on February 15, 2011, Tabuk and the 15 municipalities became cities again after the court made a third reversal. This time, the court acknowledged, among others, that the 16 cityhood laws amended RA 9009, effectively amending the Local Government Code itself.

After six years of legal battle, in its board resolution, the League of Cities of the Philippines acknowledged and recognized the cityhood of Tabuk and 15 other cities.

Geography

Barangays

Tabuk is politically subdivided into 43 barangays. These barangays are headed by elected officials: Barangay Captain, Barangay Council, whose members are called Barangay Councilors. All are elected every three years.

 Agbannawag
 Amlao
 Appas
 Bado Dangwa
 Bagumbayan
 Balawag
 Balong
 Bantay
 Bulanao
 Bulanao Norte
 Bulo
 Cabaritan
 Cabaruan
 Calaccad
 Calanan
 Casigayan
 Cudal
 Dagupan Centro (Poblacion)
 Dagupan West
 Dilag
 Dupag
 Gobgob
 Guilayon
 Ipil
 Lacnog
 Lacnog West
 Lanna
 Laya East
 Laya West
 Lucog
 Magnao
 Magsaysay
 Malalao
 Malin-awa
 Masablang
 Nambaran
 Nambucayan
 Naneng
 New Tanglag
 San Juan
 San Julian
 Suyang
 Tuga

Climate

Demographics

Economy

Government
Tabuk, belonging to the lone congressional district of the province of Kalinga, is governed by a mayor designated as its local chief executive and by a city council as its legislative body in accordance with the Local Government Code. The mayor, vice mayor, and the councilors are elected directly by the people through an election which is being held every three years.

Elected officials

References

External links

 
 [ Philippine Standard Geographic Code]
Philippine Census Information
Local Governance Performance Management System

Populated places in Kalinga (province)
Cities in the Cordillera Administrative Region
Provincial capitals of the Philippines
Populated places on the Rio Chico de Cagayan
Component cities in the Philippines